Kirsten Knip (born 14 September 1992) is a Dutch volleyball player for Ladies in Black Aachen and the Dutch national team.

She participated at the 2017 Women's European Volleyball Championship. and 2019 FIVB Volleyball Women's Nations League.

References

1992 births
Living people
Dutch expatriate sportspeople in Germany
Dutch women's volleyball players
Expatriate volleyball players in Germany
Liberos
People from Enkhuizen
Sportspeople from North Holland